Chet Baker in Milan is an album by trumpeter Chet Baker which was recorded in Italy in 1959 and released on the Jazzland label.

Reception

Allmusic awarded the album with 3 stars stating "If the adage that claims music as the universal language was never proven before, it certainly becomes obvious here. The Italian musicians are intimately familiar with the decidedly American art form of jazz, so much so that the accompanying sax solos are often rendered with more fluidity than Baker's own trumpet leads. The lack of recognizable names should not dissuade fans of West Coast cool jazz from seeking a copy of Chet Baker in Milan, as the album captures all of what is vibrant about the genre".

Track listing
 "Lady Bird" (Tadd Dameron) - 4:46
 "Cheryl Blues" (Charlie Parker) - 5:00
 "Tune Up" (Miles Davis) - 5:18
 "Line for Lyons" (Gerry Mulligan) - 7:47
 "Pent Up House"  (Sonny Rollins) - 5:00
 "Look for the Silver Lining" (Buddy DeSylva, Jerome Kern) - 4:35
 "Indian Summer" (Al Dubin, Victor Herbert) - 5:15
 "My Old Flame" (Sam Coslow, Arthur Johnston) - 4:56
Recorded in Milan, Italy on September 25 (track 1), September 26 (tracks 2-4) and October 6 (tracks 5-8), 1959.

Personnel
Chet Baker - trumpet
Glauco Masetti - alto saxophone - except 7 and 8
Gianni Basso - tenor saxophone - except 7 and 8
Renato Sellani - piano
Franco Cerri - bass
Gene Victory - drums
Giulio Libano - arranger

References 

1959 albums
Chet Baker albums
Riverside Records albums